Saratou Traoré (born 27 September 2002)  is a Malian footballer, who plays as a midfielder for Fatih Karagümrük in the Turkish Women's Super League and the Mali women's national team.

Club career
Traoré played as  attacking midfielder for Super Lionnes d’Hamdallay in her country. She enjoyed her team's runners-up rank in the Mali Women's National Football Championship and the champions title in the 2020-21 Mali w,Women's Football Cup. 

By December 2021, she  moved to Turkey, and signed with the newly established Women's Super League club Fatih Karagümrük in Istanbul. She scored 15 goals in 25 matches of the 2021-22 Women's Super League season.

International career
She is a member of the Mali women's national team.

Career statistics

References

2002 births
Living people
People from Kayes Region
21st-century Malian people
Malian women's footballers
Women's association football midfielders
Mali women's international footballers
Malian expatriate  footballers
Malian expatriate sportspeople in Turkey
Expatriate women's footballers in Turkey
Turkish Women's Football Super League players
Fatih Karagümrük S.K. (women's football) players